The 1945–46 Boston Bruins season was the Boston Bruins 22nd season of operation in the National Hockey League. The Bruins made it to the 1946 Stanley Cup Final only to lose to the rival Montreal Canadiens four games to one.

Off-season
Art Ross, who had been coach and general manager of the Bruins since their inception, retired. Dit Clapper became the team's first playing coach, while Ross remained with the team as general manager. Several players returned from war-time duty, including goalie Frank Brimsek and the Kraut Line: Milt Schmidt, Bobby Bauer and Woody Dumart. The three had played with the Ottawa Commandos, winning the Allan Cup in 1943.

Regular season

Final standings

Record vs. opponents

Schedule and results

Playoffs

Player statistics

Regular season
Scoring

Goaltending

Playoffs
Scoring

Goaltending

Awards and records

Transactions

See also
1945–46 NHL season

References
 
Notes

External links

Boston Bruins
Boston Bruins
Boston Bruins seasons
Boston
Boston
1940s in Boston